Catherine Ann Carey (born 1945) is an American lawyer and politician from New York.

Life
She was born in 1945, in Lackawanna, Erie County, New York, the daughter of William James Carey and Mary Clare (Kuebler) Carey. She graduated with a B.A. from Daemen College in 1967.

She was clerk of the New York State Assembly from 1975 to 1984, officiating in the 181st, 182nd, 183rd, 184th and 185th New York State Legislatures. In 1980, she graduated with an M.P.A. from the State University of New York at Albany.

She graduated from Albany Law School in 1987, was admitted to the bar in 1988, and practices law in Buffalo, New York.

References

1945 births
Living people
Politicians from Buffalo, New York
New York (state) Democrats
University at Albany, SUNY alumni
Albany Law School alumni
Women in New York (state) politics
People from Lackawanna, New York
Daemen College alumni
Clerks of the New York State Assembly
Lawyers from Buffalo, New York
21st-century American women